Ab Lashkar-e Olya (also Romanized as  Āb Lashkar-e ‘Olyā; also known as 'Āb-e Lashkar, Āb Lashgar, Āb Lashgar-e ‘Olyá, Āb Lashgar ‘Olyá, and Bunneh Āb-i-Lashkar) is a village in Rud Zard Rural District, in the Central District of Bagh-e Malek County, Khuzestan Province, Iran. At the 2006 census, its population was 169, in 40 families.

References 

Populated places in Bagh-e Malek County